Fort Laprairie was constructed in 1687, and served as a military fort in New France until 1713.  The fort was attacked by Major Peter Schuyler on August 11, 1691, but resisted to the invaders. The British and Dutch colonists were commanded by Major Pieter Schuyler.

The site where the fort had once stood was designated as a National Historic Site of Canada in 1921. It is now a residential area and park (Place La Mennais) located on rue Émile-Gamelin. A cairn for second battle is located at Chemin de la Bataille Nord and Chemin de Saint Jean

See also

 Military of New France
 List of French forts in North America

References

Military forts in Quebec
History of Montérégie
La Prairie, Quebec
1687 establishments in the French colonial empire